Vivek Singh (1 August 1967 – 2 February 2007) was an Indian field hockey player. He competed in the men's tournament at the 1988 Summer Olympics.

References

External links
 

1967 births
2007 deaths
Field hockey players from Uttar Pradesh
Indian male field hockey players
Olympic field hockey players of India
Field hockey players at the 1988 Summer Olympics
Sportspeople from Varanasi
Asian Games medalists in field hockey
Asian Games silver medalists for India
Medalists at the 1990 Asian Games
Field hockey players at the 1990 Asian Games